These are the results of the women's 4 × 100 metres relay event at the 1995 World Championships in Athletics in Gothenburg, Sweden.

Medalists

* Runners who participated in the heats only and received medals.

Results

Heats
Qualification: First 3 of each heat (Q) and the next 2 fastest (q) qualified for the final.

Final

References
 Results
 IAAF

- Women's 4x100 Metres Relay
Relays at the World Athletics Championships
4 × 100 metres relay
1995 in women's athletics